Andorra participated in the Eurovision Song Contest 2006 with the song "Sense tu" written by Rafael Artesero and Joan Antoni Rechi. The song was performed by Jenny, who was internally selected by the Andorran broadcaster Ràdio i Televisió d'Andorra (RTVA) to represent Andorra at the 2006 contest in Athens, Greece. The song, "Sense tu", was presented to the public on 8 March 2006 during a special gala show entitled Alguna cosa batega.

Andorra competed in the semi-final of the Eurovision Song Contest which took place on 18 May 2006. Performing during the show in position 4, "Sense tu" was not announced among the top 10 entries of the semi-final and therefore did not qualify to compete in the final. It was later revealed that Andorra placed twenty-third (last) out of the 23 participating countries in the semi-final with 8 points.

Background 

The Andorran national broadcaster, Ràdio i Televisió d'Andorra (RTVA), broadcasts the event within Andorra and organises the selection process for the nation's entry. RTVA confirmed their intentions to participate at the 2006 Eurovision Song Contest on 13 September 2005. In 2004 and 2005, RTVA had set up a national final in order to select the Andorran entry for the contest. However, the broadcaster opted for an internal selection for the first time to select the 2006 Andorran entry.

Before Eurovision

Internal selection 

RTVA selected the Andorran entry for the 2006 Eurovision Song Contest through an internal selection. A submission period was open for artists and composers to separately submit their applications and entries until 31 December 2005. Both artists and songwriters could be of any nationality and were able to submit up to three songs, with at least one being performed in Catalan. 37 song submissions and 48 artist applications, the latter of which 25 were foreign, were received at the conclusion of the submission period. On 15 February 2006, RTVA revealed that three songs, two of them written by Andorran songwriters, and four artists, three of them from Andorra and one from Spain, were shortlisted.

On 20 February 2006, Andorran newspaper Diari d' Andorra reported that Spanish singer Jenny had been selected by RTVA to represent Andorra in Athens. Jenny was confirmed by the broadcaster as the Andorran entrant on 8 March 2006 during a special gala show entitled Alguna cosa batega, hosted by Meri Picart and Josep Lluís Trabal and broadcast on ATV as well as online via the broadcaster's website atv.ad. The song "Sense tu", which was written by Rafael Artesero and Joan Antoni Rechi was presented to the public the same day during the gala show.

Promotion 
Jenny specifically promoted "Sense tu" as the Andorran Eurovision entry by taking part in promotional activities in Malta and the Netherlands. Such promotional activities included an appearance during the NET TV show Lejn il-Eurovision in Malta on 30 April.

At Eurovision 
According to Eurovision rules, all nations with the exceptions of the host country, the "Big Four" (France, Germany, Spain and the United Kingdom) and the ten highest placed finishers in the 2005 contest are required to qualify from the semi-final on 18 May 2006 in order to compete for the final on 20 May 2006; the top ten countries from the semi-final progress to the final. On 21 March 2006, a special allocation draw was held which determined the running order for the semi-final and Cyprus was set to perform in position 9, following the entry from Ireland and before the entry from Monaco. At the end of the show, Andorra was not announced among the top 10 entries in the semi-final and therefore failed to qualify to compete in the final. It was later revealed that Andorra placed twenty-third in the semi-final, receiving a total of 8 points.

The semi-final and the final were broadcast in Andorra on ATV with commentary by Meri Picart and Josep Lluís Trabal. The Andorran spokesperson, who announced the Andorran votes during the final, was Xavi Palma.

Voting 
Below is a breakdown of points awarded to Andorra and awarded by Andorra in the semi-final and grand final of the contest. The nation awarded its 12 points to Portugal in the semi-final and to Spain in the final of the contest.

Points awarded to Andorra

Points awarded by Andorra

References

2006
Countries in the Eurovision Song Contest 2006
Eurovision